The Black Cat! is an album by saxophonist Gene Ammons, recorded in 1970 and released on the Prestige label.

Reception
Allmusic awarded the album 4 stars with its review by Stewart Mason stating, "One of Gene Ammons' best late-period albums, 1970's Black Cat is a bluesy, low-key album and a comparative anomaly: a primarily acoustic soul-jazz album! Ammons was experimenting heavily with the amplified, feedback-laced electric saxophone during this period, but for Black Cat he sticks to his familiar unamplified tenor, playing raunchy gutbucket lines".

Track listing 
All compositions by Gene Ammons except where noted.
 "The Black Cat" (George Freeman) – 5:36  
 "Long Long Time" (Gary White) – 4:31  
 "Piece to Keep Away Evil Spirits" – 7:49  
 "Jug Eyes" – 8:10  
 "Something" (George Harrison) – 3:20  
 "Hi Ruth!" – 5:08

Personnel 
Gene Ammons – tenor saxophone
Harold Mabern – piano, electric piano
George Freeman – guitar
Ron Carter – bass 
Idris Muhammad – drums
Unidentified violins arranged by Bill Fischer (tracks 2 & 5)

References 

Gene Ammons albums
1971 albums
Prestige Records albums
Albums produced by Bob Porter (record producer)
Albums recorded at Van Gelder Studio